Haskell Vaughn Anderson III is an American film, television and theater actor.  He is most known for his role in the 1989 martial arts film Kickboxer.  He starred in the 1976 film Brotherhood of Death and appeared in the 2007 independent feature Boy and Dog.

Theater
His stage performances include Tracers in New England and Australia. In Lions, a play by Vince Melocchi about the Detroit Lions, Anderson played the role of Bisquit. He is a recipient of the NAACP Image Theatre Award for Best Supporting Actor for his performance in the original play Rounds by Sean Michael Rice. In 2010, he appeared as Frank Malgado in the world premier of Vince Melocchi's Julia. In 2011 he played the part again in the off-Broadway production at the 59 East 59th Street Theatre.

He is a company member of the Pacific Resident Theatre in Los Angeles.

Film
In the early 1980s, he was involved with the L.A. Rebellion black film movement at UCLA, appearing in shorts by S. Torriano Berry (Rich, 1982) and Monona Wali (Grey Area, 1982).

Along with screenwriter Mugs Cahill, Anderson developed the story for 40 DAYS ROAD and is attached to star in the film project which is currently seeking financing.

Other work
He is a guest artist at Professional Arts Lab, at the University of California, Santa Barbara.

In 2010, Anderson was selected for a two-year term to serve as president of Catholics in Media, based in Los Angeles.

References

External links

Haskell Anderson's official website
Video interview

African-American male actors
American male film actors
American male television actors
20th-century American male actors
Living people
Year of birth missing (living people)
20th-century African-American people
21st-century African-American people